Birte Bruhns (born 4 November 1970) is a retired German runner who specialized in the 800 metres.

She started her career at the SC Empor Rostock, after the German reunification she moved to Cologne where she represented the sports club ASV Köln, and became German champion in 1993. Her personal best time was 1:59.17 minutes, achieved in July 1988 in East Berlin.

Achievements

References

1970 births
Living people
German female middle-distance runners
SC Empor Rostock athletes
ASV Köln athletes
20th-century German women